Ocean Plaza is one of the largest shopping and entertainment complexes of Kyiv, Ukraine. it was inaugurated in 2012 and currently houses more than 470 stores and 40 restaurants and cafes. The second queue of the mall is called Ocean Mall, it's located next to original mall and is currently under construction.

Overview 
The plaza has 7 floors and a parking area of 1600 parking lots. At the time of its completion, Ocean Plaza had been the largest mall in Ukraine, and it kept this status until Lavina Mall's opening in 2016. The plaza has a 350,000-liter giant aquarium with more than 1,000 sea creatures and offers 16-meter-long panoramic view. There are several multiplexes and movie theatres. Ukraine's first 7D cinema was housed in this plaza. In 2013, Forpoint opened Ukraine's first Cinnabon cafe at this plaza.

History 
In 2000's, a market near the Kyiv Refrigeration Plant was demolished to build a large mall called Lybid Plaza, it was named after the Lybid river at the bank of which the construction site was located. The original project was bigger, the building's area was one million m². Lybid Plaza was presented at MAPIC retail forum in Cannes in 2007 and 2008, and various developers were interested in buying a 50% share of the it, but the global financial crisis interrupted these plans. After the crisis, the project was renamed to Ocean Plaza and its space was cut to 150 000 m². Also, it was planned to build an office tower and an apartment tower as the mall's second queue; however, they were cancelled later on.

The construction of the mall began in 2010 with a plan of finishing it in March 2012, prior to UEFA Football Championship. In November, KAN Development presented the updated project at MAPIC-2010. In December, Ocean Mall project was also presented at Mall Expo 2010 summit in Kyiv where it had won the Mall Awards 2010 in the category Best Project in the Capital. In November 2011, UTG presented the project at MAPIC-2011.

In December 2011, the statue made by Frank Meisler was transported from Israel to Ukraine in order to be placed inside the Ocean Plaza and to become a symbol of the mall.

In July 2012, Vasyl Khmelnytsky, Andrey Ivanov and Vagif Aliev had sold the Ocean Plaza to Russian TPS Nedvizhimost for  million.

Ocean Plaza was opened on 19 November 2012. Initially,  million was invested for the project. Before the inauguration of the plaza, Kyiv Post reported in their newspaper that the event was the "most anticipated events for Kyiv's retail world." Right after the official inauguration, an opening celebration took place on 7 December.

The City Beach Club opened 20 August 2013 on the rooftop of Ocean Plaza.

In December 2013, the mall won at CP Awards 2013 in Kyiv in the category Large Shopping Mall.

Ownership 
Since July 2012, the mall was co-owned by Russian TPS Nedvizhimost and Ukrainian investment and development companies UDP and KAN Development. TPS Nedvizhimost is controlled by Liliya Rotenberg (daughter of Arkady Rotenberg), Alexander Ponomarenko and Alexander Skorobogatko.

After the Russo-Ukrainian War began in 2014, many Ukrainians began to boycott Russian business in the country. On 26 November 2018, unknown people attacked the mall with smoke grenades, and visitors were evacuated. On 28 November, Sokil nationalist activism organization took Ocean Plaza under their 'peaceful control'. Over 200 nationalists captured the mall with a goal of stopping Russian oligarchy from financing the war. In social media, the organization described their actions as a peaceful protest and stated that they didn't interrupt the work of Ukrainian business. They also told people not to panic and warned them about possible provocations from Rotenberg's allies.

Accidents 
In December of 2012, when the construction work inside the mall was still in progress, a part of the ceiling between the stores fell down, details of an accident are unknown.

In the evening of 13 January 2020 due to the accident at the underground pipeline, Ocean Plaza was flooded with boiling water, the asphalt at surrounding streets collapsed and the minibus that was passing the mall almost fell into the hole on the road. Shopping mall's security had to block the elevators because the underground floor was completely filled with water. People from the first floor had to get up to the top floors with escalators or jump into their shopping carts. That day ten people were hospitalized with light burns.

References

External links 
  

Shopping malls established in 2012
Buildings and structures in Kyiv
Shopping malls in Kyiv
Tourist attractions in Kyiv